United States v. Brewster could refer to:

United States v. Brewster (1833), 32 U.S. (7 Pet.) 164 (1833) (per curiam), on counterfeiting
United States v. Brewster (1972), 408 U.S. 501 (1972), on bribery and the Speech or Debate Clause